Frenchman's Pass is a narrow passage on the island of Aruba, between coral cliffs above the area known as Spanish Lagoon. From the pass one can see the remains of the Balashi Gold Mine.

Legend has it that French pirates tried to invade Aruba in the early 17th century and were confronted by Indians in this narrow passage above Spanish Lagoon.  After this encounter, the passage became known as “Franse Pas” or “Rooi Frances” in Papiamento, which translates to “Frenchman Pass” in English.  Many Indians were killed during the invasion, and today inhabitants near "Frenchman pass" claim they hear crying noises from the Indians during the evening. Some say the Indian ghosts are awake and haunting the area known as Spanish Lagoon.

References

Geography of Aruba